Orchesella spectabilis is a species of slender springtail in the family Entomobryidae. It is found in Europe.

Body size can be up to 40 mm. The species can be found in countries like Sweden and Finland. It typically occurs in moss and forestes.

References

Collembola
Articles created by Qbugbot
Animals described in 1871
Arthropods of Europe